Calosoma calidum is a species of ground beetle in the subfamily of Carabinae. It was described by Johan Christian Fabricius in 1775. It occurs throughout Canada and the northern and eastern parts of the United States. About 19mm to 27mm long, this beetle is black with rows of red or gold spots or pits on its elytra. It can be found in fields and disturbed habitats. Larvae and adults prey upon moth caterpillars.

References

calidum
Beetles described in 1775
Taxa named by Johan Christian Fabricius